Coady is both a surname and a given name. Notable people with the name include:

Surname:
 Aaron Coady, American drag queen also known as Sharon Needles
 C.A.J. (Tony) Coady (21st century), Australian philosopher
 Charles Pearce Coady (1868-1934), Member of the United States House of Representatives
 Conor Coady (born 1993), English footballer
 Ed Coady (born circa 1867), American football player
 John Coady (born 1960), Irish footballer
 Lynn Coady (born 1970), Canadian novelist and journalist
 Mick Coady (born 1958), English footballer (Sunderland AFC, Carlisle United, Wolverhampton Wanderers)
 Moses Coady (1882-1959), Roman Catholic priest, educator and leader of the co-operative movement
 Rich Coady (disambiguation), multiple people
 Siobhán Coady (21st century), Newfoundland and Labrador politician

Given name:
 Albert Coady Wedemeyer (1897-1989), American soldier
 Coady Willis (21st century), drummer

See also
 Coady, Texas, unincorporated area
 Cody (disambiguation)